Scott Township is a township in Allegheny County, Pennsylvania, United States. The population was 17,024 at the 2010 census.

Geography
Scott Township is located at  (40.391469, -80.079657).

Surrounding and adjacent communities
Scott Township has nine land borders, including the Pittsburgh neighborhood of East Carnegie and Green Tree to the north, the Pittsburgh neighborhood of Banksville to the northeast, Mt. Lebanon to the east, Upper St. Clair Township to the south, Bridgeville to the southwest, Collier Township and Heidelberg to the west, and Carnegie to the northwest. A short segment of Chartiers Creek separates Scott from Rosslyn Farms to the northwest.

Demographics

At the 2000 census there were 17,288 people, 7,835 households, and 4,583 families living in the township. The population density was 4,350.8 people per square mile (1,681.3/km2). There were 8,163 housing units at an average density of 2,054.3/sq mi (793.9/km2).  The racial makeup of the township was 91.35% White, 1.15% Black or African American, 0.08% Native American, 6.17% Asian, 0.01% Pacific Islander, 0.23% from other races, and 1.01% from two or more races. Hispanic or Latino of any race were 0.68%.

There were 7,835 households, 22.5% had children under the age of 18 living with them, 48.3% were married couples living together, 7.6% had a female householder with no husband present, and 41.5% were non-families. 36.8% of households were made up of individuals, and 14.7% were one person aged 65 or older. The average household size was 2.14 and the average family size was 2.83.

The age distribution was 18.6% under the age of 18, 5.2% from 18 to 24, 31.6% from 25 to 44, 22.5% from 45 to 64, and 22.1% 65 or older. The median age was 42 years. For every 100 females there were 88.9 males. For every 100 females age 18 and over, there were 84.7 males.

The median household income was $44,434 and the median family income  was $54,716. Males had a median income of $42,095 versus $31,499 for females. The per capita income for the township was $24,439. About 4.5% of families and 7.2% of the population were below the poverty line, including 8.1% of those under age 18 and 8.6% of those age 65 or over.

Government and Politics

Education
Scott Township is served by the Chartiers Valley School District.

Events
Until 2015, the world's largest pinball tournament, Pinburgh, was held in Scott Township at the PAPA facility. In 2015, the tournament was moved to the David L. Lawrence Convention Center in downtown Pittsburgh.  The Professional and Amateur Pinball Association (PAPA), still headquartered in Scott Township (Carnegie, PA mailing address), manages Pinburgh, along with the World Pinball Championships.

References

External links
Scott Township official website

Townships in Allegheny County, Pennsylvania